was a Japanese mathematician specializing in topology.

In 1956, Jun-iti Nagata earned his PhD from Osaka University under the direction of Kiiti Morita. He was the author of two standard graduate texts in topology: Modern Dimension Theory and Modern General Topology. His name is attached to the Nagata–Smirnov metrization theorem, which was proved independently by Nagata in 1950 and by Smirnov in 1951, as well as the Assouad–Nagata dimension of a metric space, which he introduced in a 1958 article.

Nagata became a professor emeritus at both Osaka Kyoiku University, where he taught for 10 years, and Osaka Electro-Communication University, where he taught for 5 years.

Works 
 Jun-iti Nagata: Modern Dimension Theory, Interscience Publishers (1965)
 Jun-iti Nagata: Modern General Topology, John Wiley (1968), 
 Kiiti Morita – Jun-iti Nagata: Topics in General Topology, North-Holland (1989) 
 K.P. Hart, Jun-iti Nagata, and J.E. Vaughan: Encyclopedia of General Topology, Elsevier Science (August 16, 2004),

References

External links 
 Brief obituary notice by ams.org
 

20th-century Japanese mathematicians
21st-century Japanese mathematicians
Topologists
1925 births
2007 deaths
Osaka University alumni